Borrelia andersonii is a spirochete bacterium. It can be pathogenic, being involved in cases of Lyme borreliosis.

See also
 Lyme disease microbiology

References

Further reading

External links
 NCBI Taxonomy Browser - Borrelia

andersonii
Bacteria described in 1995